Samastipur is one of the thirty-eight districts of Bihar in India. The district headquarters are located at Samastipur. The district occupies an area of 2904 km² and has a population of 4,261,566.

History 
Samastipur became a district in 1972 when it was split from Darbhanga district.

Samastipur consists of four sub-divisions :-

 Rosera
 Samastipur
 Dalshinghsarai
 Shahpur Patory

Geography
Samastipur is bounded on the north by the Bagmati River which forms part of the border with Darbhanga district. On the west it is bordered by Vaishali and Muzaffarpur districts, on the south by the Ganga, which forms the border with Patna district, while on its southeast are Begusarai and Khagaria districts. The district headquarters is located at Samastipur. The district is largely agricultural farmland with very little forest cover.

Politics
Ujiarpur Lok Sabha constituency and Samastipur Lok Sabha constituency are the Parliament constituencies.

|}

Economy
In 2006 the Ministry of Panchayati Raj named Samastipur one of the country's 250 most backward districts (out of a total of 640). It is one of the 36 districts in Bihar receiving funds from the Backward Regions Grant Fund Programme (BRGF).

Demographics

According to the 2011 census Samastipur district has a population of 4,261,566, roughly equal to the Republic of the Congo or the US state of Kentucky. This gives it a ranking of 45th in India (out of a total of 640). Its population growth rate over the decade 2001-2011 was 25.53%. Samastipur has a sex ratio of 911 females for every 1000 males, and a literacy rate of 61.86%. 3.47% of the population lives in urban areas. Scheduled Castes and Scheduled Tribes make up 18.85% and 0.04% of the population respectively.

At the time of the 2011 Census of India, 52.32% of the population in the district spoke Hindi, 30.79% Maithili and 8.40% Urdu as their first language. 8.29% of the population recorded their language as 'Others' under Hindi.

References

External links 
 Samastipur District Official Website
 Samastipur District Profile

 
Darbhanga division
Districts of Bihar
Populated places in Mithila, India
1972 establishments in Bihar